Karen Creed is an Irish multimedia journalist and presenter with Raidió Teilifís Éireann (RTÉ), Ireland's national radio and television station, where she has been a relief presenter for the Six One News. She previously worked for France 24, Irish Examiner and Dublin's Q102.

Career
Creed began her career as an intern journalist for News Italia Press in May 2004. She moved on to become a senior broadcast journalist for Dublin's Q102 from February 2005 to May 2008, and then as an editor for the Sunday Independent Travel Magazine for four years until 2011. In 2006, Creed was a freelance journalist for the Irish Examiner and at the same time, she was a broadcast journalist and news presenter with France 24 until May 2013, when she joined Raidió Teilifís Éireann (RTÉ) as a multimedia journalist, reporter and news presenter for the Six One News.

Personal life
Creed was born in Coachford, County Cork and attended Scoil Mhuire, Cork and graduated from Dublin Institute of Technology where she received a Bachelor's degree in science and journalism.

Creed is married to Peter and have three children, Simone, Faith and Ronan.

References

Living people
RTÉ newsreaders and journalists
Irish journalists
Irish women journalists
Irish women radio presenters
People from County Cork
Year of birth missing (living people)
People educated at Scoil Mhuire, Cork